Ioannis "Giannis" Palios (born 20 June 1946) is a retired Greek water polo player who competed in the 1968 and the 1972 Summer Olympics. Born in Piraeus, he played at the club level for Olympiacos.

References

1946 births
Living people
Greek male water polo players
Olympiacos Water Polo Club players
Olympic water polo players of Greece
Water polo players at the 1968 Summer Olympics
Water polo players at the 1972 Summer Olympics
Water polo players from Piraeus